Toropovo may refer to:
Toropovo, Nizhny Novgorod Oblast, a village in Nizhny Novgorod Oblast, Russia
Toropovo, Tula Oblast, a village in Tula Oblast, Russia
Toropovo, name of several other rural localities in Russia